The first Christiansborg Palace in Copenhagen, Denmark, was built on Slotsholmen in 1745 as a new main residence for King Christian VI of Denmark. It was built on the same site as its predecessor, Copenhagen Castle, which had assumed a monstrous appearance and started to crumble under its own weight after several extensions.

The palace existed for just under half a century since it was almost completely destroyed by a fire in 1794. The surviving parts, which included the show grounds, the court theatre and the Marble Bridge with its two pavilions, were incorporated into the second Christiansborg Palace which succeeded it. These parts also survived the fire of 1884 which destroyed the second palace and are now part of the present day Christiansborg Palace which houses both the Danish Parliament, Supreme Court and Prime Minister's Office.

History

Construction of the new palace
Demolition of the overextended and antiquated Copenhagen Castle began in 1731 to make room for the new palace which was named Christiansborg after its founder. The king commissioned architect Elias David Häusser to build the new palace.

Construction of the magnificent new palace began in 1733. From 1736 the younger architects Lauritz de Thurah and Nicolai Eigtved were put in charge of designing the interior. In 1738 a palace commission was set up to supervise the construction. Work only progressed slowly due to lack of funds and on several occasions threatened to come to a complete standstill. However, by 1740 the main wing was partially ready for use and Christian VI took up residence at a grandiose ceremony on 26 November 1740.

When Häusser retired from the project in 1742, Eigtved was charged with completing the palace. This happened in 1745. The palace commission was dissolved on 22 February 1745.

The total costs of the new palace were 2.7 million Rigsdaler, the equivalent to half of the state's annual income.

The fire of 1794
On 26 February 1794, Christiansborg Palace was devastated by a fire. It began in an overheated stove close to the Grand Hall.

Architecture and artworks

Overall layout
The palace complex, which was in Rococo style, consisted of a four-winged main building connected to various other buildings, including a court theatre and stables, arranged around large show grounds. There was also an attached chapel located at the site of the present-day Christiansborg Chapel. It was the largest palace in Europe for a short while, until the fire destroyed it.

The main approach to the palace was across the still existing Marble Bridge, today located on the rear side of present-day Christiansborg, and the show grounds.

Main building
The main building stood 36 metres high with a copper-clad roof and an 84 metre high steepled tower located above the main entrance facing the show grounds. The façade was covered in sandstone and lavishly decorated with vases, reliefs, sculptures and ornamental details on cornices and window frames.

The interior was also in Rococo style and lavishly decorated. Work on producing artworks and decorations for the palace continued throughout the reign of Frederick V, and the Grand Hall, which was designed by Nicolas-Henri Jardin, was not inaugurated until 10 November 1766 by Christian VII. Among the artists who had their breakthrough with their contributions to the palace are the painters Nikolaj Abildgaard and Hendrick Krock and the sculptors Johannes Wiedewelt, Simon Stanley and Johan Mandelberg.

See also
 List of Danish royal residences

References

Palaces in Copenhagen
Royal residences in Denmark
Official residences in Denmark
Baroque architecture in Copenhagen
Houses completed in 1745
Former buildings and structures in Copenhagen
1745 establishments in Denmark